Garma Poshteh (also Romanized as Garmā Poshteh) is a village in Baladeh Rural District, Khorramabad District, Tonekabon County, Mazandaran Province, Iran. At the 2006 census, its population was 290, in 78 families.

References 

Populated places in Tonekabon County